Zasław concentration camp (in ) was a World War II Nazi German concentration camp, established for ghettoised Jews in occupied Poland near the village of Zasław (now part of Zagórz in Poland),  south-east of the industrial city of Sanok which belonged to the Lwów Voivodeship of the Second Polish Republic before the invasion. Sanok had one of the largest Jewish population in the region.

Operation
Zaslaw was a forced labor camp where Polish Jews living in the city of Sanok and its vicinity were deported for confinement and exploitation before the onset of the Holocaust in occupied Poland. Between 1940 and 1943 some 15,000 prisoners passed through the camp. 
 
On January 15, 1943, the prisoners of Zaslaw were transported to the Belzec extermination camp, where they were killed in gas chambers.

Commemoration
A memorial to murdered Jews was erected in Zasław by the employees of the bus company in Sanok. The memorial to victims of Nazism sits almost directly opposite the town cemetery in Zasław.

Notes and references

Nazi concentration camps in Poland